The X'Trapolis 100 is a class of single deck electric multiple units part of Alstom's X'Trapolis family of trains, operated in Melbourne, Victoria, Australia and Valparaíso, Chile.

Melbourne

In service 

When originally introduced to the suburban network in 2002, the trains operated only on the former Hillside network (consisting of the Burnley and Clifton Hill group lines), and did not run revenue services elsewhere operated by M>Train on the Bayside Trains half of the system. Although the networks merged in 2004, when Connex took over all operations, the X'trapolis units did not operate on the Bayside system at the time.

On 22 October 2014, the operation of X'Trapolis 100 trains was expanded to include lines on the former Bayside Trains network with the Frankston line being cleared for their operation and initially running two weekday morning-peak services.

On 20 November 2016, X'Trapolis 100 trains were expanded to full-time running on the Frankston line and began operating services on the Werribee and Williamstown lines the same day.

In November 2018, X'Trapolis 100 trains’ operations were expanded to the Flemington Racecourse line.

X'Trapolis 100 trains run on the Burnley, Clifton Hill and Cross-City groups, with all services operating with 6-car trains throughout the day except the Alamein line shuttles which runs with 3-car trains during shuttle operations off-peak and on weekends. The trains also serve the Flemington Racecourse line when services operate there, operating to both Showgrounds and Flemington Racecourse stations. However, the Flemington Racecourse Line only runs on special occasions.

Although Melbourne's trains operate as either one or two three-car units, it was not until September 2007 that the X'Trapolis 100s were permitted to operate as single-units in revenue service.

The trains have power-operated doors that open when a button on the door is pressed and are closed by the driver or closed automatically after approximately thirty seconds.

The X'Trapolis 100s and the High Capacity Metro Trains (HCMT) are currently the only suburban trains in Melbourne with external destination displays on the sides of the carriages with this feature also seen on the diesel powered Sprinter and VLocity rail motors.

Several trains were given names: Croydon West (primary school that won a naming contest), Don Corrie (deceased railway employee), Flash, Flinders Flyer, Iramoo (primary school that won a naming contest), Melbourne Rocks and Westernport. X'Trapolis 100 863M-1632T-864M-897M-1649T-898M was the first Melbourne train to receive the new ‘Metro’ livery in November 2009, in preparation for the launch of the new suburban operator. When the Connex livery was retired in place of the current Metro design, the Iramoo name (shown on units 851M and 852M) was erroneously written as Imaroo. This spelling is still unchanged as of August 2018.

Refurbishment 
As part of its 2009 franchise agreement, Metro Trains Melbourne was required to modify the 3+2 seating layout in all original X'Trapolis 100s to have 2+2 seating, providing efficiency in passenger flow and more standing room. Later orders of X'Trapolis 100s were delivered with this modified layout.

All cars prior to the sixth batch sets underwent an additional interior refurbishment program starting from 2017, similar to the refurbishment that the Siemens Nexas had recently completed. All X'Trapolis sets comprising the first–fifth orders had a number of seats removed at the ends of the motor cars to create dedicated spaces for passengers using wheelchairs and also provide standing room for additional passengers, thus increasing overall capacity, accessibility and passenger flow of each motor carriage. Additional handrails and emergency assistance intercoms were also installed in accordance to the same interior design of the motor cars since the sixth batch.

Mechanics 
Mechanically, these trains are very different from the previous generation Melbourne trains. The X'Trapolis 100 was the first EMU in Melbourne to have computer-controlled traction, braking and safety systems. A continuous electrical circuit runs along the length of the train, which, when energised allows the train's emergency brakes to release. The circuit will be de-energised by a number of events, such as the driver releasing a vigilance control, applying an emergency brake or passing a signal at stop. This will cause the train to apply all brakes.

Incidents 
On 9 December 2004, 882M overran the platform at Belgrave and crashed into the fence at the end of the line.

On 26 September 2009, 872M crashed into a car between Croydon and Mooroolbark, derailed on impact and destroyed an overhead power stanchion. The Ford Fairmont had crashed down the embankment onto the tracks and was abandoned prior to the train collision. Coincidentally, on 3 January 2013, a Hitachi train derailed in the same location on the city-bound line due to rails buckling in hot weather.

On 12 May 2010, an almost brand new 9M overran a siding in Ringwood, derailing and crashing into the siding fence. The train had entered service less than a month prior.

On 24 March 2011, 920M overran the dead-end platform at Macleod, crashing into the fence at the end of the platform. Prior to the accident, the platform had recently been washed and the soapy water had ended up on the tracks causing a complete loss of friction. Additionally, it was found that the end-of-line baulks (two wooden sleepers placed across the rails in lieu of a buffer stop) were also defective; the train wheels simply pushed them along the rails.

On the morning of 11 November 2015, an individual later identified as a then Metro employee gained access to the cabin of an X'Trapolis 100 six-car set stored at the depot of Hurstbridge station and drove it into a derail block, causing it to be derailed. 927M received the most damage in the incident from ploughing into an adjacent X'Trapolis set, whilst other carriages and track equipment were damaged. All carriages are expected to be back in revenue service after being repaired.

On 6 February 2016, 1305T, led by 9M, derailed just before Rushall station city-bound, where the track is a very tight 30 km/h bend. The South Morang line was partially suspended while the carriage was placed back onto tracks.

On 9 November 2018, a Lilydale-bound service, led by 959M, uncoupled in running shortly after departing Croydon Station, splitting into two three-car units, with the trailing unit coming to a stop under emergency braking. The subsequent investigation found that a wiring error during a modification to the train's low-note whistle on 959M, combined with a deterioration of insulation resistance in the uncouple solenoid connector of 882M (the leading carriage of the trailing unit), resulted in an error circuit forming which resulted in the unintended coupling.

On 12 August 2021, X'Trapolis set 871M-1636T-872M collided with a semi-trailer truck at the High Street Road level crossing near  station before 8am, causing damage to the train only. Substantial damage was caused to the overhead structure by the truck, and the front bogie of the train derailed. After recovery efforts, the set was then taken to Epping Workshops.

Valparaíso 

Valparaíso has had an interurban passenger train system since the 19th century, but it could not be called a metro due to an infrequent train service and other shortcomings. In 1999 construction began on the current system, tearing down the old stations and building new ones with a homologous design. In Viña del Mar, a tunnel more than five kilometres in length was constructed. The new trains, specially made for the new system, arrived in Chile on 22 February 2005 and the old system was decommissioned on 30 June 2005.

The metropolitan railway that opened in 1855 between the Barón station in Valparaíso and El Salto, near Viña del Mar, is the oldest continuously operating railway in the southern hemisphere. At the end of the 1990s, the decision was made to renew the railway equipment, equip the region with state-of-the-art trains and, at the same time, organize a new functional structure with new stations and the undergrounding of an important part of the route.

The purchase of the rolling stock was completed in November 2002, with the signing of a contract between Merval and the French company Alstom, which in addition to guaranteeing the delivery of 27 convoys of 2 cars, included signaling, control systems and electrical power, as well of various items that ensured maintenance for 30 years.

The work for the implementation of this project, called Stage IV, began in 1999, with the demolition of the solid construction stations, replacing them with bus stops, and only remodeling the Limache station for the new uses that would later be given to it, making them architectural homologation and functionally. The road was buried with the construction of a tunnel of more than 5 kilometres between the Caleta Abarca and El Salto sectors in the Viña del Mar commune, leaving 4 stations under the street line, and allowing a restructuring of the fascia urban environment via Vina Mar. The work on the tunnel suspended the service was between July and November 2005.

The first car of the new fleet arrived in Chile on 22 February 2005. On 30 June 2005, a farewell ceremony was held for the old Suburban Electric Motor Vehicles (AES), built in Argentina by Fiat Concord, which provided commercial service until July 2005. At 12:45pm a "symbolic" tour began that began in Valparaíso and concluded in Limache. Thus, stations, bus stops and the signalling system completed their last day.

The service began with a 3-day white march, operating partially outside the tunnel between 21 and 23 November 2005. On 23 November, the inauguration ceremony was held, which was attended by the then President of Chile Ricardo Lagos. The service formally began on 24 November 2005.

Merval rolling stock 
Unlike the Melbourne version, Merval trains do not have intermediate cars. They only consist of two cars with a cabin, one motor (which has the pantograph) and another trailer. They can also operate as double units, forming convoys of 4 wagons, but always smaller than the Melbourne version.

The door system is the same as in the Melbourne version. The doors are activated by pressing a button on the door and are closed by the driver or after two minutes. Each car has three passenger doors per side, which gives a total of six doors per single car and 12 per trainset.

Each car has a single pantograph that delivers energy to the motor car from the catenary available throughout the network.

Due to the lack of a catenary, the trains do not operate beyond the Limache station, although the possibility of extending Merval's service to La Calera is being analysed.

Changes in passenger seats 
Contrary to what was done in Melbourne, Merval announced a reduction in seat capacity of its trains, to be implemented between October and December 2014. This reduction seeks to increase train capacity to meet the growing demand of passengers. Although exact figures were not provided, a reduction of approximately 46 seats per train is expected, to be homologated to the 96 that the X'Trapolis Modular has, a model of which 8 units will arrive in 2015 to reinforce Merval's service.

Antimicrobial trains 
In a pioloto plan between state copper company Codelco and Alstom, one car was modified to include antimicrobial copper in the handrails and contact areas. The modification, which included the removal of handles and panels, is part of the search for new uses for copper that Codelco carries out as part of its market development plan.

However, months later, the copper railings were removed and the car returned to its original condition.

Note

References

External links 

 X'Trapolis 100 photos at Gran Valparaíso (in Spanish)

Electric multiple units of Victoria (Australia)
Melbourne rail rollingstock
3000 V DC multiple units
Alstom multiple units
1500 V DC multiple units of Victoria